The News of the World Championship was one of the first major    organised darts competitions, which began in 1927. It became England's first national darts competition from 1947, as the years went by it gradually became international essentially becoming the first world darts Championship and was the hardest darts tournament to win until its demise in 1990. There was also a brief revival of the event in 1996/97, but it is now discontinued. It was organised by the National Darts Association of Great Britain (NDAGB).

Before the tournament was established, darts competitions were held in various forms around England – often as friendly matches between pubs. After World War I, pub breweries began arranging darts leagues which began to sow the seeds for the establishment of a national darts competition. The tournament was noted for using an 8 ft oche rather than the regulation 7 ft 9 ¼ inches. One of these competitions was held in Hythe Street, Dartford, Kent in 1927. The competition was sponsored by a local Brewery, C.N Kidd & Sons Ltd.

Origins 
The tournament was first organised in the 1927/28 season thanks to the help of the staff on the News of the World newspaper and other volunteers, who helped set up the competition. William Jewiss won the 1927 darts challenge cup sponsored by News of the World and C.N Kidd & Sons brewery in Dartford.

There were around 1,000 entries in the first event, which was held in the Metropolitan area of London. The tournament then began to expand around the different counties in England. By 1938/39 there were six different regional events – London & South England, Wales, Lancashire & Cheshire, Yorkshire, the North of England and the Midland Counties.

The total entrants in the competition in 1938/39 were in excess of 280,000. Enormous interest was created that year by the London and South of England championship. A record crowd of 14,534 spectators filled the Royal Agricultural Hall, London in May to witness the final between Jim Pike (representing the Windmill Club, Southwark) and Marmaduke Brecon (Jolly Sailor, Hanworth, Middlesex). Brecon ran out the winner by two games to one. The tournament continued to attract 250,000 entries during the post war years.

There was, however no national champion of the event until after World War II. It was revived as a national competition in 1947/48, and continued to be described as "the championship every dart player wants to win" until its demise in the 1990s. It can also be classed as the first world darts championships as it went international and players from different countries entered and even won the tournament.

In 1979, Bobby George became the only player to win the championship without losing a leg. Stefan Lord was the only player from outside the United Kingdom to win the event.

Demise 
The News of the World was the first nationally televised darts event as ITV broadcast the latter stages of the championship from 1972 to 1985, and again in 1987 and 1988. The 1986 event wasn't broadcast due to a technicians' strike.

As quickly as darts tournaments began to appear on television throughout the 1970s and into the early and mid 1980s, the bubble burst and all darts competitions except the World Championship disappeared from TV screens in 1989.

This big sudden slump in televised darts coverage meant that it came as no surprise that the News of the World Championship also ended after the 1990 event, with the last two events having been untelevised. As it happened, 1990 was also the first year that separate competitions were held for men and women.

The lack of televised darts coverage left some players frustrated by the lack of opportunity to make a living from darts, and in January 1992 they formed their own organisation to start up their own tournaments (see main article: Professional Darts Corporation, and Split in darts).

1997 revival 

The News of the World Championship made a one-year reappearance in the 1996/97 season, when Sky Sports and the News of the World resurrected the competition.

In his autobiography, Phil Taylor says that his mentor, Eric Bristow always mocked him for never having won the competition and that it was the tournament that everyone wanted to win. Bristow himself recalled his father telling him: "You're not a proper world champion until you've won the News of the World". 

Taylor put the record straight by beating Ian White 2–0 in the final in June 1997, collecting the News of the World Big D Trophy, a cheque for £42,000 and a set of Unicorn golden darts. Following his victory, which also saw him take out the then England captain Martin Adams 2–1 in the semi finals, Taylor was quoted as saying "I've won five world titles – but this one means everything".

However, the overall response to the competition was disappointing and the News of the World decided against running it again. The tournament remains discontinued.

Tournament winners

Men
The tournament was arranged on a regional basis from 1927 until 1939. The National Championship began in 1947–48 winners and runners-up included:

Women

Multiple winners 
No player has ever won the international title three times, seven players managed two wins each.
 Tommy Gibbons (1951–52, 1957–58)
 Tom Reddington (1954–55, 1959–60)
 Tom Barrett (1963–64, 1964–65)
 Stefan Lord (1977–78, 1979–80)
 Eric Bristow (1982–83, 1983–84)
 Bobby George (1978–79, 1985–86)
 Mike Gregory (1986–87, 1987–88)

Venues 
 1948–49: Empire Pool (Wembley Arena), Wembley, London
 1950–58: Empress Hall, Earls Court, London
 1959–62: Empire Pool (Wembley Arena), Wembley, London
 1963–77: Alexandra Palace, London
 1978–88: Wembley Arena, Wembley, London
 1989–90: Docklands Arena, London
 1997: Villa Park, Birmingham

References

Sources

External links 
 History of tournament including historical pictures

1927 establishments in England
1990 disestablishments in England
1996 establishments in England
1997 disestablishments in England
Darts tournaments
News of the World
Alexandra Palace